1996 Indian general election was held in Maharashtra on 27 April, 2 May, and 7 May 1996. Maharashtra returns 48 MPs to the Lok Sabha.

The National Democratic Alliance consisting of BJP and Shiv Sena won 33 seats, while the Congress won 15 seats.

Results

Constituency-wise results

References

1996 Indian general election
Indian general elections in Maharashtra